Karsten Brodowski (born 22 June 1985 in Neuruppin) is a German rower.

References 
 
 

1985 births
Living people
Sportspeople from Neuruppin
Olympic rowers of Germany
Rowers at the 2008 Summer Olympics
World Rowing Championships medalists for Germany
German male rowers